Vincenzo Mollame (Naples, 4 July 1848 – Catania, 23 June 1912) was an Italian mathematician.

Mollame was privately tutored by Achille Sanni and then studied Mathematics at the University of Naples Federico II. After obtaining his degree, he became a high-school teacher, first at Benevento and after that at Naples, starting in 1878. He became a professor at the University of Catania in 1880 and remained there for the rest of his career, having retired in 1911, a few months before his death.

Molleme's research activity stopped in 1896, due to health problems.

Mollame was the author of a textbook on determinants.

Notes

External links
 Short biography (in Italian)

1848 births
1912 deaths
Algebraists
19th-century Italian mathematicians